Katra is a Finnish symphonic metal band founded by vocalist .

Members
Katra Anniina Solopuro (born 10 August 1984 in Tampere, Finland) has been studying piano since the age of 6.  At 14 she switched to voice lessons.  Today she studies singing and theatre music in Tampere University of Applied Sciences.  She also has a background in dance and gymnastics. She has a daughter, Illusia, whose father is Risto Katajisto, the guitarist of Lovex. In her former bands, Lovex and Essentia, she played keyboard and sang background vocals. She was also the vocalist for cover band Coverstone and symphonic metal band Feridea.

Other current members of Katra include guitarist Kristian Kangasniemi (Sonicmind), bassist Johannes Tolonen (Plain Fade, Alcoholica), drummer Matti Auerkallio (Avenie, Duality, Animal House, Mistreaters and Four Hoarsemen), and guitarist Teemu Mätäsjärvi (Alcoholica).

History

"Sahara" single (2006) and Katra (2007)
Solopuro released a single "Sahara" in September 2006. Then she formed the band Katra and published the self-titled album Katra through Edel Records in spring 2007. The "Sahara" single received much radio play and while on tour, the band started writing new material. Katra also released a single that included the songs "Tietäjä" and "Vaaratar".

Napalm Records signing and Beast Within (2008)
In November 2007 it was announced that Napalm Records signed Katra and asked for an international version of their 2007 album Katra. The band re-recorded the 2007 album Katra in English, along with two new songs and named the English language release Beast Within. The album was produced by Risto Asikainen (Stratovarius) at Jean Records Studio. Beast Within was published in late August/early September 2008. The band played a couple of gigs in Germany, including Summer Breeze Open Air 2009 and received a good response. Katra also released a video for the title track "Beast Within". On June 19, 2010 Katra opened for Theatre of Tragedy at Circo Volador in Mexico, a career highlight for all of the members.

Out of the Ashes (2010)
Out of the Ashes was released in October 2010 internationally through Napalm Records and in Finland through Bullhead Music. Although it is their third album, Katra considers it their first creation as a band. A video was released for the song "One Wish Away" that features an appearance by UniFlow, fire and lihtperformance group in Finland. The German magazine Orkus reviewed it as darker, more melancholic and more determined than the previous album.

New album announcement, and work with Feridea (2015)
In December 2014 Katra Solopuro joined Feridea as their vocalist. On January 10, 2015, Katra Solopouro announced via her Facebook account that she entered to studio to record a new album, in order to be released in the next spring Into A Dawn was released in march 2015 Feridea

Press and honors
Katra have been featured in Germany's Orkus magazine, where they won "Best International Newcomer" in the 2009 fan poll, and China's X music magazine. Katra have also been nominated in the "Best Atmospheric/Symphonic Metal" category for the album Beast Within on the Estonian webzine Metal Storm.

Line-up
Current members

2006: Katra Solopuro – vocals
2006: Kristian Kangasniemi – guitar
2006: Johannes Tolonen – bass
2009: Teemu Mätäsjärvi – guitar
2009: Matti Auerkallio – drums

Former musicians
2006: Jani Wilund – keyboards
2006: Tom "Tomma" Gardiner – guitar
2006-2009: Jaakko Järvensivu – drums

Tour musicians
2008: Teemu Mätäsjärvi – guitar

Discography

Studio albums
2007: Katra (Edel)
2008: Beast Within (Napalm)
2010: Out of the Ashes (Napalm)

Singles
2006: Sahara
2007: Tietäjä/Vaaratar
2010: One Wish Away

Music videos
2007: Tietäjä
2008: Beast Within
2010: One Wish Away

References

External links
Katra's personal official website
Band's official website
Band's official Myspace
Band's blog
Band's page at Metal Storm

Finnish symphonic metal musical groups